Tetraonchus is a genus of flatworms belonging to the family Tetraonchidae.

The species of this genus are found in Northern America.

Species:
 Tetraonchus alaskensis Price, 1937 
 Tetraonchus awakurai Ogawa & Egusa, 1978

References

Platyhelminthes